Lesoparkovaya is a station on the Moscow Metro's Butovskaya Line, between Ulitsa Starokachalovskaya and Bittsevsky Park,

The station opened for revenue service on 27 February 2014.

Location
Lesoparkovaya's location is parallel with the MKAD motorway.

Building
The station is shallow depth and has single-vault design with two vestibules at each end, which stairs connect to the platform.

References

Moscow Metro stations
Butovskaya Line
Railway stations in Russia opened in 2014
Railway stations located underground in Russia